The 1983 Individual Ice Speedway World Championship was the 18th edition of the World Championship. The Championship was held on 5 and 6 March, 1983 at the Kunstijsbaan in Eindhoven in the Netherlands.

The winner was Sergey Kazakov of the Soviet Union for the second successive year.

Classification

See also 
 1983 Individual Speedway World Championship in classic speedway
 1983 Team Ice Racing World Championship

References 

Ice speedway competitions
Wor